The Greyhound is a breed of dog. 

Greyhound, grayhound, and related variant terms can also refer to:

Long-distance bus companies
Greyhound Australia
Greyhound Canada, which was established as Canadian Greyhound Coaches Limited in 1929 and acquired by Greyhound US in 1940
Greyhound Lines, United States
Greyhound Mexico
Greyhound Motors, Bristol, England, which operated between 1921 and 1972 (from 1935 as Bristol Greyhound)
Greyhound UK, which operated between 2009 and 2015
Western Greyhound, Cornwall, England, which operated between 1998 and 2015

Former operators associated with Greyhound Lines (USA)
Atlantic Greyhound Lines
Dixie Greyhound Lines
Florida Greyhound Lines
Southeastern Greyhound Lines
Teche Greyhound Lines
Tennessee Coach Company, an independent carrier which cooperated with Atlantic GL and Southeastern GL (1928–56)
The Greyhound Corporation

Other transportation
Greyhound Air, an airline company owned by Greyhound Canada from 1996 to 1997
, the name of various British Royal Navy ships
M8 Greyhound, armoured car used by the Allies during World War II
 Greyhound was one of the GWR 3031 Class locomotives that were built for and ran on the Great Western Railway between 1891 and 1915
, the name of various United States Navy ships
Greyhound (automobile company), a defunct cyclecar company in the United States
C-2 Greyhound, a cargo plane

Fictional transportation
Greyhound, codename of a fictional World War II warship in the 2020 war film Greyhound

Music
Greyhound (band), a British reggae ensemble
Greyhoundz, a Filipino rock band
Greyhounds (band), an American band
"Greyhound", a song by John Vanderslice from his 2002 album Life and Death of an American Fourtracker
Greyhound (song), by Swedish House Mafia

Sports
 East High School Grayhounds, Duluth, Minnesota, USA; secondary school sports team
Sault Ste. Marie Greyhounds, an OHL major-junior hockey team
Greyhound (horse), standardbred harness-racing racehorse

Other
Greyhound (film), a 2020 WWII naval war film
Greyhounds (police), a police special operation group in the Andhra Pradesh state of India
Greyhound (cocktail), commonly made from gin and grapefruit juice
Greyhound Recycling, a recycling company in Ireland
Greyhound Electronics, a defunct amusement games manufacturer in New Jersey

See also

Hound (disambiguation)
Grey (disambiguation)
Gray (disambiguation)